Rattenkönig (German: "rat king") is the fifth full-length album by French black metal band Mütiilation. The title is a Germanic folkloric tale of rats being attached by the ends of their tails.

Track listing
 "That Night When I Died" (6:45)
 "Testimony of a Sick Brain" (4:57)
 "The Bitter Taste of Emotional Void" (7:33)
 "Black Coma" (4:17)
 "The Pact (The Eye of the Jackal)" (6:49)
 "The Ecstatic Spiral to Hell" (4:35)
 "I, Satan's Carrion" (5:24)
 "Rattenkönig" (7:22)

Production
Written, Arranged & Produced By Meyna'ch

Personnel
Meyna'ch: Vocals, Guitars, Bass, Drum Programming

Trivia
 A digipack CD released by Battlesk'rs Productions and limited to 1000 copies.
 A picture LP was released by End All Life Productions in 2006.

References

External links
Album info on Discogs
Album info on Encyclopaedia Metallum

Mütiilation albums
2005 albums